Karamo is a given name. Notable people with the name include:

Karamo Brown (born 1980), American television host, reality television personality, author, actor, and activist, also host of a self-titled TV talk show titled Karamo
Karamo Jawara (born 1991), Gambian-Norwegian basketball player 
Karamo (talk show), a tabloid show hosted by Karamo Brown that premiered in 2022
Kristina Karamo (born 1985), American far-right politician, chairperson of the Michigan Republican Party